Candice King ( Accola)  is an American actress and singer. She is best known for her role as Caroline Forbes in The CW supernatural drama series The Vampire Diaries and her recurring role as the same character on the spin-off series The Originals and Legacies.

Early life
Candice Accola was born in Houston, Texas, the daughter of Carolyn and Kevin Accola, a cardiothoracic surgeon. She grew up in Edgewood, Florida, and attended Lake Highland Preparatory School in Orlando. She has one younger brother.

Career

Music

In December 2006, King released her debut album, It's Always the Innocent Ones, independently in the United States. She co-wrote 12 of the 14 tracks on the record. The remaining tracks were a cover of 'Til Tuesday's hit "Voices Carry (song)" and American Hi-Fi's "The Breakup Song" rewritten in a female version as "Our Breakup Song".

In 2008, the album was re-released in Japan and achieved greater success. King toured as a backing singer for Miley Cyrus's Best of Both Worlds Tour. She appeared as herself in the 2008 3D concert film Hannah Montana & Miley Cyrus: Best of Both Worlds Concert.

In February 2011, King performed a cover of "Eternal Flame" by The Bangles on The Vampire Diaries.

Acting
King had guest appearances in a number of television series such as How I Met Your Mother, Supernatural, and Drop Dead Diva. In July 2009, she starred in the horror film Deadgirl which centers on two high-school boys who discover an immortal woman in an abandoned asylum. That same year King had a bit-role in The Hannah Montana Movie.

In 2009, she was cast in the CW television series The Vampire Diaries as Caroline Forbes, one of the main characters of the show. In June 2012, she joined the second season of the web series Dating Rules From My Future Self, as Chloe Cunningham, a 26-year-old woman who believes love does not exist. The series centers on a girl receiving romance advice from herself ten years in the future by text message. She played Kimberly in the 2020 romance sequel After We Collided.

Personal life
King started dating musician Joe King of The Fray after they met at a Super Bowl event in February 2012. Her costar Nina Dobrev introduced them. They became engaged in May 2013, and married on October 18, 2014, in New Orleans, Louisiana. She is stepmother to King's two daughters from his first marriage.

In January 2016, King gave birth to a daughter. In December 2020, King gave birth to their second daughter. In May 2022, Accola announced that she had filed for divorce.

Filmography

Film

Television

Awards and nominations

References

External links

 
 

21st-century American actresses
21st-century American singers
Actresses from Houston
American women singer-songwriters
American film actresses
American television actresses
Living people
21st-century American women singers
Year of birth missing (living people)
Singer-songwriters from Texas
Singer-songwriters from Florida
Actresses from Orlando, Florida
Lake Highland Preparatory School alumni